Dariusz Radosz (born 13 August 1986) is a Polish rower. He competed in the men's quadruple sculls event at the 2016 Summer Olympics.

References

External links
 

1986 births
Living people
Polish male rowers
Olympic rowers of Poland
Rowers at the 2016 Summer Olympics
Sportspeople from Toruń
European Rowing Championships medalists